This is a list of players for the Powerade Tigers, a Philippine Basketball Association team formed on 2002 who appeared for at least one game.

A

B

C

D

E

F

G

H

I

J

K

L

M

P

Q

R

S

T

V

W

Y

Z

References

Philippine Basketball Association all-time rosters